Larchill is the most complete surviving ferme ornée (ornamental farm-style garden) in Europe and the site of multiple follies.  The main component of Larchill Demesne, it was created in the mid-18th century, and restored in the mid-1990s.  It lies in the townland of Phepotstown near Kilcock, County Kildare, Ireland.

History
The gardens were formed in the late 18th and early 19th century, by Mr. Robert and Mrs. Watson.

A family named de Las Casas bought Larchill in 1994.  By then, many of the follies were semi-derelict, the lake had been drained and the walled garden was being used for grazing. They secured a grant for restoration from the 'Great Gardens of Ireland Programme' and, helped by a FAS Community Employment Scheme, the restoration project was carried out between 1994 and 1999, winning a number of awards.

Features

Layout
The farm and garden form a rough rectangle, with scenic parkland walks, including beech avenues, linking key features.  The walled garden and farmyard are situated at the north end, and a substantial lake at the south end.

Walled garden and farmyard
Restored to a traditional 18th century formal design in the 1990s, the walled garden has multiple beds, including herb and vegetable sections, borders of perennial planting, box hedges, and water features.

A feature of the walled garden is the 'Cockle Tower', a circular castellated construction on three-levels in the south west corner.  Commenced in 1820, it has rough limestone rubble walls, and an entrance on the first level above ground, reached by steps.  Both doorway and windows have pointed arches.  The interior was decorated with shells, of which some remain.  There is a local legend that Mrs. Watson was buried there, until later owners had her remains moved to a churchyard.

Also attached to the walls is an ornamental dairy, on the southern elevation.  Begun around 1810, it has an arcade, with columns, arched openings and stained glass windows, and a shell fountain.

The Gothic-style farmyard, in the form of two courtyards to north of the main house, has dovecotes, stable ranges and pigsties. The buildings have slate roofs, limestone dressings, and timed-framed and diamond-paned windows.

Lake
There is also an ornamental Gothic boathouse dug into the side of the lake, with a single-arch to the lake, and a wrought-iron gate to the rear. By the lake are water and flower meadows. Fauna include frogs, dragonflies, wild duck and swans.

There is a Chinese prayer lantern to the south of the lake, with a Chinoiserie bridge, in place of what used to be a bridge to the Temple Island.

Follies
 The Fox's Earth, an ornamented mausoleum mound, built by Mr. Watson because he believed he would be punished for excessive fox-hunting by being reincarnated as a fox, and would need a refuge. The "Earth" is a three-bay one-storey façade set on an artificial hillock, with a small 6-pillar rustic temple on top. Pointed arch openings to three-bay façade. A rubble stone bridge leads to the site.
 Rustic Temple (woodland), commenced between 1800 and 1820, with six rendered columns in a hexagonal plan, stone seats, and a rubble stone dome. The temple is flanked by rendered walls with circular terminating piers.
 Temple Island with Lake Temple, whose roof sloped inwards to gather rainwater in a plunge pool
 "Gibraltar" is a miniature triangular fortress, based on Mr. Watson's memories of the Rock of Gibraltar, started around 1820. It has corner towers and turrets, rendered walls with castellations, and openings with pointed arches and gun loops.

Mock naval battles were fought on the lake in past centuries.

Other features
There is an 18th-century "sheep run" and at the north end of the western walk are a 19th-century Chinese prayer lamp and statue.  There is also an eel pond, and an "eel house", a tower in which to catch eels.

When the lake was dug in the 18th century, the soil from the excavation was used to form a "feuillé", a circular mound with a decorative spiral of beech trees on top.

Farm animals
Rare breeds of animal were used in the 18th and 19th century in such gardens, and today various breeds of cattle and sheep, along with llamas and emus, graze the parkland, while pigs, goats and fowl can be found in the farmyard.

Facilities
There is parking for cars and coaches and a picnic area. The gardens open May to June, and for a few days in September-October, and an admission fee is charged.  The former general tea room in a converted barn, which also included a gift shop, operates only for groups.

Sources
 NIAH listing for the Rustic Temple
 NIAH listing for the Fox's Earth 
 Official website

References and notes

Kilcock
Folly buildings in the Republic of Ireland
Gardens in County Kildare